José de Jesús (born 18 September 1954) is a Puerto Rican long-distance runner. He competed in the marathon at the 1976 Summer Olympics.

References

1954 births
Living people
Athletes (track and field) at the 1975 Pan American Games
Athletes (track and field) at the 1976 Summer Olympics
Puerto Rican male long-distance runners
Puerto Rican male marathon runners
Olympic track and field athletes of Puerto Rico
Place of birth missing (living people)
Pan American Games competitors for Puerto Rico